Dragonology: The Complete Book of Dragons is a 2003 fiction book written by Dugald Steer, and published by Templar Publishing in the United Kingdom, and by Candlewick Press in the United States.

Overview
The fictional premise of this book is that it is a facsimile of a lost work originally printed in 1895 and supposedly written by a dragonologist named Dr. Ernest Drake with the current publisher being unable to determine the truth of the matter. It presents the research and findings of Dr. Ernest Drake on the dragons of the world, their biology, behavior, and history of their interactions with humans. The book is vastly illustrated and contains a number of smaller, additional texts and tactile ‘specimens’ such as dragon scales, wing membrane, and dragon dust.

Format 
This book, like the other books in the Ologies series, is assigned a fictional "author" who then acts as the narrator of the book. Dr. Ernest Drake is the fictional author and owner of the original Complete Book of Dragons, with Dugald Steer being the creator of Drake, and the writer of this and several other books in the series. It is written in an encyclopedic manner rather than following any particular narrative, while also giving the reader puzzles in the book and small notes as if the fictional writer had sent them that book.

Related media 
Dragonology: The Complete Book of Dragons was followed up by a number of sequels both in the Oology series and in its own right. The Oology series continues with Egyptology: Search for the Tomb of Osiris. However while these are authored by Dugald Steer, other than Monsterology: The Complete Book of Fabulous Beasts, they do not have anything to do with Dragonology or Dr. Ernest Drake. But there is the Dragonology collection of books which includes Dragonology: Tracking and Taming Dragons: A Guide for Beginners Vol 1. and Vol. 2, Dr. Ernest Drake's Dragonology Handbook: A Practical Course in Dragons, and Drake's Comprehensive Compendium of Dragonology among others.

Dugald Steer also wrote a series of children's books called the Dragonology Chronicles based around the lore created in the Dragonology books. There are four books in this series. The Dragon's Eye published in 2006, The Dragon Diary published in 2008, The Dragon's Apprentice published in 2011, and The Dragon Prophecy published in 2012.

Film adaptation
In June 2008, Universal Studios acquired the film rights to the Dragonology series, with  Leonard Hartman set to write and executive produce the adaptation. In August 2012, it was reported that Alex Kurtzman and Roberto Orci will produce the Dragonology: The Complete Book of Dragons movie for Universal with a new screenwriter. In January 2018, Paramount Pictures acquired Dragonology: The Complete Book of Dragons and the rest of the Ology series and hired Akiva Goldsman to oversee a writer's room to write scripts for interconnected family movies based on the books and supplemental material with Goldsman and his Weed Road partner Greg Lessans producing the films.

See also

Dragonology

References

External links
The Dragonology website 
Candlewick Press's website

2003 children's books
Books by Dugald Steer
British picture books
Books illustrated by Helen Ward
Books illustrated by Nghiem Ta
Books about dragons
Candlewick Press books
Children's fiction books